Greylings Pass, Is situated in the Eastern Cape, province of South Africa, on the regional road R396, between Dordrecht, Eastern Cape and Barkly East.

Mountain passes of the Eastern Cape